Vinegar Hill may refer to:

Elevations
 Vinegar Hill (Enniscorthy), a hill above Enniscorthy, County Wexford, Ireland
 Vinegar Hill (New York), a mountain in Greene County
 Vinegar Hill (Oregon), in the Greenhorn Mountains
 Vinegar Hill, a mountain in Beaverhead County, Montana

Settlements
 Vinegar Hill, Brooklyn, a neighborhood in New York City
 Vinegar Hill, New Zealand, a locality and campsite in Manawatu-Wanganui
 Vinegar Hill, Ontario, Canada
 Vinegar Hill, Queensland, Australia
 Vinegar Hill Historic District, Bloomington, Indiana
 Vinegar Hill (Charlottesville, Virginia), a neighborhood
 Vinegar Hill Township, Jo Daviess County, Illinois
 Vinegarhill, a former location in Glasgow, Scotland
 Vinegar Hill, a locality near Magor, Monmouthshire, Wales

Other uses
 Battle of Vinegar Hill, an engagement during the Irish Rebellion of 1798
 Castle Hill convict rebellion of 1804 in Australia, sometimes referred to as the second Battle of Vinegar Hill
Vinegar Hill (novel), a 1994 novel by A. Manette Ansay
Vinegar Hill (film), a 2005 TV movie based on the novel, starring Mary-Louise Parker